Espejos azules is the fourth studio album by the Argentine singer Pablo Ruiz. It was released in 1990.

Track list 

 Manías
 Nuestro Amor
 Fantasmas En Tu Habitación
 Espejos Azules
 No Sé Qué Pasará
 Pregúntale A La Luna
 Loco Por Ti
 Carcajadas
 Manías (Remixed version) (Bonus track)

References 

Pablo Ruiz (singer) albums
1990 albums